Hoseynabad-e Alizadeh (also Romanized as Ḩoseynābād-e ‘Alīzādeh; also known as Ḩoseynābād and Husainābād) is a village in Akhtarabad Rural District, in the Central District of Malard County, Tehran Province, Iran. According to the 2006 census, its population was 45 in 11 families.

References 

Populated places in Malard County